William Cage may refer to:
William Cage (MP for Rochester) (1666–1738)
William Cage (MP for Ipswich) (died 1645)
William Cage (Tennessee politician)
William "Bill" Cage, character in All You Need is Kill